is a Japanese voice actor who works for 81 Produce. He made his radio CM narration debut on 2 March 1993.

Filmography

Anime
 Nintama Rantarou (1993-04-10), Kanzaki Samon
 Trigun (1998-04-01), young Vash the Stampede
 Neo Ranga (1998-04-06), Joel
 Bubblegum Crisis Tokyo 2040 (1998-10-07), Mackey Stingray
 Digimon Adventure (1999-03-07), PicoDevimon
 Hoshin Engi (1999-07-03), Nataku
 Magic User's Club (1999-07-07), Naoki Nakatomi
 Hamtaro (2000-07-07), Torahamu
 Gravitation (2000-10-04), Eiri Yuki (child)
 Super GALS! Kotobuki Ran (2001-04-01), Masato Iwai
 Shaman King (2001-07-04), Ashil
 Angel Tales (2001-10-04), Rei
 RahXephon (2002-01-21), Souichi Yagumo
 GetBackers (2002-10-05), Jouya Kanou
 Bakuten Shoot Beyblade G-Revolution (2003-01-06), Mystel
 Wandaba Style (2003-04-05), Dr. Susumu Tsukumo
 Saint Beast (2003-05-08 – 2007-04-02), Suzaku no Rei
 Gilgamesh (2003-10-11), Toru Tsukioka
 Kyo Kara Maoh! (2004-04-03), Ken Murata
 Harukanaru Toki no Naka de Hachiyō Shō (2004-10), Shimon Nagareyama
 Tactics (2004-10-05), Kantarou Ichinomiya
 Bleach (2005-10-05), Hanatarō Yamada
 Suki na Mono wa Suki Dakara Shōganai! (2005-01-08), Sei Hashiba
 Emma (2005-04-02, 2007-04-16), Arthur Jones
 Tsubasa: Reservoir Chronicle (2005-04-09), Yukito Tsukishiro
 Noein (2005-10), Isami Fujiwara
 Doraemon (2005-10-09), Goro 
 Karin (2005-11-03), Winner Sinclair
 Major (2005-12-10), Daisuke Komori – second season
 Marginal Prince (2006-10-01), Mikhail Nevsky
 Kenichi: The Mightiest Disciple (2006-10-07), Ryōto Asamiya (child)
 Naruto Shippuden (2007-02-15), Chōjūrō
 Bokurano (2007-04-08), Kunihiko Moji
 Goshūshō-sama Ninomiya-kun (2007-10-03), Mitsuru Hosaka
 Shugo Chara! (2008-10-04 – 2009-10-03), Rhythm – seasons two and three
 07-Ghost (2009-04-06), Labrador
 Inuyasha: The Final Act (2009-11-14), Spirit of Mount Azusa
 Baka to Test to Shōkanjū (2010-01-06 – 2011-07-07), Kōta Tsuchiya
 Kami-sama no Memo-chō (2011-07-02), Hitoshi Mukai "Shōsa"
 Phi Brain: Puzzle of God (2011-10-02), Cubic Galois
 Beyblade: Metal Masters (2011-03-04), Toby / Faust
 One Piece (2011-??-??), Wadatsumi, Dellinger
 Shirokuma Cafe (2012-04-05), Badger, Red Squirrel Mama, Sea Otter
 Kingdom (2012-06-04), Chengjiao
 Magi: The Labyrinth of Magic (2012-10-07), Ahbmad Saluja
 Amnesia (201301-07), Ukyo
 Free! (2013-07-03 – 2014-07-02), Aiichiro Nitori
 Danganronpa: The Animation (2013-07-04), Chihiro Fujisaki, Alter Ego
 Meganebu! (2013-10-06), Mitsuki Kamatani
 Yowamushi Pedal (2013-10-07), Terufumi Sugimoto
 D-Frag! (2014-01-06), Hachi Shiō
 100% Pascal-sensei (2017), Kawai (ep. 28)
 Boogiepop and Others (2019), Echoes
 Demon Slayer: Kimetsu no Yaiba (2019), Murata
 Star Twinkle PreCure (2019), Oliphio
 In/Spectre (2020), Nushi no Orochi
 Chainsaw Man (2022), Zombie Devil
 Digimon Tamers (????-??-??), Kumbhiramon
 Doraemon (????-??-??), Tora Arthur

Original video animation (OVA)
 Chocolat no Mahō – Cacao
 Air Gear: Kuro no Hane to Nemuri no Mori – Kilik
 Angel Tales: Tenshi no Shippo Chu! – Rei
 Angel's Feather – Anri Chikura
 Baka to Test to Shōkanjū: Matsuri – Kōta Tsuchiya
 Detective Conan: The Miracle of Excalibur – Akira
 Harukanaru Toki no Naka de~Ajisai Yume Gatari~ – Shimon Nagareyama
 Harukanaru Toki no Naka de2~Shiroki, Ryuu no Miko~ – Akifumi
 Harukanaru Toki no Naka de3~Kurenai no Tsuki – Musashibo Benkei
 Koisuru Boukun – Tomoe Tatsumi
 Saint Beast – Suzaku no Rei
 Suki na Mono wa Suki Dakara Shōganai! – Sei Hashiba
 Kirepapa – Riju

Films
 Haruka: Beyond the Stream of Time (2006-08-19), Shimon Nagareyama
 Bleach: Fade to Black (2008-12-13), Hanatarō Yamada
 Detective Conan: Quarter of Silence (2011-04-16), Tōma Tachihara
 Heart no Kuni no Alice (2011-07-30), Peter White
 Fairy Tail the Movie: Phoenix Priestess (2012-08-18), Duke Cream
 Boruto: Naruto the Movie (2015-08-07), Chōjūrō
 Free!: Timeless Medley (2017-04-2), Aiichirō Nitori – dilogy

Video games
 Alice in the Country of Hearts – Peter White
 Amnesia – Ukyo
 Amnesia Later – Ukyo
 Amnesia Crowd – Ukyo
 Blue Dragon – Jiro
 Crash Bandicoot: Bakuso! Nitro Kart – Real Velo
 Danganronpa: Trigger Happy Havoc – Chihiro Fujisaki, Alter Ego
 Glass Heart Princess – Hoshino Kanata
 Fushigi Yūgi: Suzaku Ibun – Chichiri
 Harukanaru Toki no Naka de – Shimon Nagareyama
 Harukanaru Toki no Naka de 2 – Akifumi
 Harukanaru Toki no Naka de 3 – Musashibō Benkei
 Harukanaru Toki no Naka de 4 – Nagi
 Magical Drop F – Magician
 Reijou Tantei Office no Jikenbo - Koji
 Silver Chaos – Pam
 Suto*Mani: Strobe*Mania - Keigo Kisaragi
 S.Y.K – Gyokuryuu
 The Saint of Braves Baan Gaan – Hiro Sakashita in Brave Saga
 Seishun Hajimemashita! – Ichitaka Enmei
 Touken Ranbu – Hōchō Tōshirō
 Danganronpa Another Episode: Ultra Despair Girls – Taichi Fujisaki
 Piyo tan ~Hausukīpā wa Cute na Tantei~ – Toru Ninomiya
 Piyo tan ~Oyashiki Sen'nyū ☆ Daisakusen~ – Toru Ninomiya
Nightshade – Ieyasu Tokugawa

Drama CDs
 Ai de Kitsuku Shibaritai ~Koi Yori Hageshiku~ – Kajika Fujimoto
 Amai Kuchizuke – Yuu Takamura
 Bad Boys! – Itsumu Suzuna
 Blue na Koneko – Kouhei Kuzumu
 Bukiyou na Silent – Satoru Toono
 Crimson Spell – Ruruka
 Damasaretai – Yuuma Matsusaki
 Danna-sama, Ote wo Douzo – Haruka Fujino
 Gouka Kyakusen de Koi wa Hajimaru series 4, 5, 7, 8 – Huang
 Himitsu no Kateikyoushi – Yuuya Sakurai
 Hisoyaka na Jounetsu Series side story 1: Iro no Aku – Shiki Nihako
 Kageki series 5: Kageki ni Tengoku – angel 1
 Kubisuji ni Kiss ~Hong Kong Yakyoku~ – Ryuutarou Imai
 Miwaku no Ringo – Yonekura Ken
 Munasawagi series – Akira Haneoka
 Niehime to Kemono no Ō - Set
 Pink na Koneko – Kouhei Kuzumu
 Saikyou no Koibito – Chihiro Kunika
 Tsuki no Sabaku Satsujin Jiken – Suzuya Takanashi
 Yosei Gakuen Feararuka -Futago no Sylph ni Goyojin- – Nyiru
 Youma na Oresama to Geboku na Boku – Masamichi Adachi
 Yuuwaku Sentiment – Yuuya
 Piyo tan ~Hausukīpā wa Cute na Tantei~ - Toru Ninomiya

Tokusatsu
 Bakuryuu Sentai Abaranger – Blastasaur Triceratops
 Bakuryū Sentai Abaranger DELUXE: Abare Summer is Freezing Cold! – Burstosaur Triceratops
 Bakuryū Sentai Abaranger vs. Hurricaneger – Burstosaur Triceratops
 Tokusou Sentai Dekaranger vs. Abaranger – Burstosaur Triceratops
 Tensou Sentai Goseiger – Datas (eps. 4 - 50)/Datas Hyper/Mystic Datas Hyper
 Kamen Rider Decade – Basshaa (ep. 4 - 5)
 Zyuden Sentai Kyoryuger – Debo Akkumuun (ep. 25, 37)

Dubbing
 Exchange Student Zero – Max Cameron
 The Batman – Prank
 Bob the Builder – Travis
 Boy Meets World – Stuart Minkus
 The Care Bears' Big Wish Movie – Grumpy Bear
 Care Bears: Journey to Joke-a-lot – Grumpy Bear
 Care Bears: Oopsy Does It! – Grumpy Bear
 Corpse Bride – General Bonesapart
 Garfield's Pet Force – Nermal
 The Hobbit film series – Ori
 Horse Sense – Tommy Biggs
 Jumping Ship – Tommy Biggs
 Legend of the Guardians: The Owls of Ga'Hoole – Digger
 The Nephew – Peter O'Boyce
 Now You See It... – Cedric
 Pet Alien – Tommy Cadle
 Phineas and Ferb – Phineas Flynn
 Phineas and Ferb the Movie: Across the 2nd Dimension – Phineas Flynn, Phineas-2
 Romeo & Juliet: Sealed with a Kiss – Romeo
 Sam & Cat – Dice
 Sleepy Hollow – Young Masbath
 Small Soldiers – Alan Abernathy
 Spider-Man – Randy Robertson
 Spy Kids 3-D: Game Over – Francis
 Taken – Jacob Clarke (child)
 Teen Titans – Beast Boy
 Teen Titans Go! - Beast Boy
 Twas the Night – Danny Wrigley
 The Virgin Suicides – Chase Buell
 Watership Down – Fiver
 Young Justice – Beast Boy

References

External links
Official agency profile 
 Kōki Miyata at GamePlaza-Haruka Voice Acting Database 
 Kōki Miyata at Hitoshi Doi's Seiyuu Database
Kōki Miyata at Ryu's Seiyuu Infos
 

1972 births
Living people
81 Produce voice actors
Japanese male voice actors
Male voice actors from Yokohama
20th-century Japanese male actors
21st-century Japanese male actors